Langøytangen Lighthouse is a fully automated coastal lighthouse situated on the island of Langøya in Langesund in municipality of Bamble, Norway. It marks the southern point of the Langesund sound. It is available for rental for overnight guests.

See also
 List of lighthouses in Norway
 Lighthouses in Norway

References

 
 
 Norwegian Lighthouse Association

External links

 Norsk Fyrhistorisk Forening 

Lighthouses completed in 1839
Lighthouses in Vestfold og Telemark
Bamble